Pseudodoliops griseus is a species of beetle in the family Cerambycidae. It was described by Stephan von Breuning in 1938. It is known from the Philippines.

References

Apomecynini
Beetles described in 1938